Anak Agung Bagus Perwira Karang, known as Ajun Perwira (born in  Denpasar, Bali; 9 February 1988) is an Indonesian actor, presenter, and musician.

Television series
 Nada Cinta (2011)
 Cinta Sejati (2011–2012)
 Segalanya Cinta (2012)
 FTV MD Kupinang Kau Dengan Bis Kota (2012)
 FTV Cinta Hingga Akhir Waktu
 FTV MD Love in Warteg (2013)
 Kinara (2013, with Mikha Tambayong)

Filmography 
 Di Bawah Lindungan Ka'bah (2011)
 Poconggg Juga Pocong (2011)
 Pocong Kesetanan (2011)
 My Last Love (2012)
 Love is Brondong (2012)
 Bila (2012)
 3 Pocong Idiot (2012)
 Get M4rried (2013)
 Ghost Diary (2016)

Presenter 
 JKT48 2nd Generation Audition (RCTI)
 Dahsyat (RCTI)
 Ceplas Ceplos (Trans 7)

References

External links 
Ajun Perwira on his Twitter

1988 births
Living people
People from Jakarta
Balinese people
Indonesian actors